Wandile Gabada Mjekevu (born 7 January 1991) is a South African rugby union player who plays as a center or a wing for Sporting Club Albigeois in the French Top 14 competition.

Career

Club

Golden Lions

He started his career with the Johannesburg-based . He represented them at Under-16 level in 2007 and at the 2008 Craven Week tournament. He eventually made a total of ten appearances during the tournament. He played for the s in the 2010 Under-21 Provincial Championship Group A, making three appearances.

Sharks

He played in 13 matches for the  during the 2012 Under-21 Provincial Championship.

However, he failed to break into their Currie Cup squad and the following season, he played in the 2013 SARU Community Cup for Durban-based club side College Rovers. He scored a brace of tries in their match against SK Walmers and a hat-trick the following week against Villagers Worcester as College Rovers finished runners-up in the inaugural competition.

Perpignan

In 2013, Mjekevu signed a deal to join French Top 14 side  in 2013. He scored four tries in 15 appearances for them in the 2013–14 Top 14 season, which wasn't enough to prevent his side finishing 13th and being relegated to the Rugby Pro D2. He also scored two tries in three appearances in the 2013–14 Heineken Cup.

Return to Sharks

After the 2014–2015 European season, Mjekevu returned to the  prior to the 2015 Currie Cup Premier Division, signing a two-year deal with the team.

Kings

Mjekevu was named in the Sharks squad for the 2016 Super Rugby season, but failed to make any appearances in the first thirteen rounds of the competition and was loaned out to the Port Elizabeth-based  for the remainder of the season.

Return to Europe: Top 14 and Nationale

After a handful of appearances, he moved to Stade Olympique Chambérien Rugby for the 2021/2022 season, playing for them on 15 occasions. On 21 June 2022, Sporting Club Albigeois announced that Mjekevu was returning to them for the 2022/2023 season

Representative rugby

Mjekevu earned a number of call-ups to junior South African sides. He was selected in a South African Under-18 Elite Squad in 2008 and subsequently selected in the final South African Schools squad in the same year. In 2009, he was included in a South African Under-18 High Performance Squad and he was a member of the South Africa Under-20 team that played in the 2010 and 2011 IRB Junior World Championships.

References

External links
 
 itsrugby.co.uk Profile
 LNR Profile

1991 births
Living people
Expatriate rugby union players in France
Golden Lions players
Lions (United Rugby Championship) players
Rugby union centres
Rugby union players from Durban
Rugby union wings
Sharks (Currie Cup) players
Sharks (rugby union) players
South Africa Under-20 international rugby union players
South African expatriate rugby union players
South African expatriate sportspeople in France
South African rugby union players
Southern Kings players
USA Perpignan players